Emilio Rodríguez may refer to:

 Emilio Rodríguez (cyclist) (1923-1984), Spanish professional road bicycle racer
 Emilio Rodríguez (actor) (d. 1988), Spanish police man and actor
 Emilio Hector Rodriguez (b. 1950), Cuban artist